Regatta is a global brand and part of The Regatta Group, which is privately owned. It consists of Regatta Great Outdoors, Craghoppers, Dare2b, and Regatta Professional. The brand sells through major outdoor retail chains, through its own stores and concessions, and through e-commerce. The company is based in Manchester.

Description 
In 1977 Lionel Black bought a small workwear company called Risol Products. In 1981 he started developing the Regatta brand and in 1996 the company changed its name to Regatta Ltd. Regatta bought the Hawkshead outdoor clothing stores in 2010.

Products 
Regatta's product line includes waterproof and breathable jackets, fleeces, trousers, footwear and camping equipment for men, women and children.

Awards 
The company has been awarded the Queen's Award for Enterprise: International Trade on two occasions (2012 and 2013) due to its international growth.

Partnerships 
The brand launched their first licensed partnership with  Peppa Pig in early 2021. The range includes waterproof jackets, puddlesuits, wellies, fleeces and other children's' garments.

Celebrity ambassadors 
Regatta work with celebrity ambassadors which have in the past included Girls Aloud member Kimberley Walsh as well as Alesha Dixon and Vogue Williams.

TV presenter Rochelle Humes is the current ambassador for the brand, launching a collection of eight jackets in September 2021.

References

External links
Regatta official website
Regatta US official website

Clothing companies of England
Outdoor clothing brands
Manufacturing companies based in Manchester
Companies established in 1981
Clothing companies established in 1981
1981 establishments in England